D & C Builders Ltd v Rees [1965] EWCA Civ 3 is a leading English contract law case on the issue of part payment of debt, estoppel, duress and just accord and satisfaction.

Facts
D & C Builders Ltd was a two man building firm run by Mr Donaldson and Mr Casey. They had done work for Mr Rees at 218 Brick Lane, London E1, coming to £732. Mr Rees had only paid £250. £482 was owing. D&C were facing bankruptcy if they were not paid. Mrs Rees phoned up to complain that the work was bad, and refused to pay more than £300. D&C reluctantly accepted and took a receipt marked ‘in completion of account’. After that, they consulted their solicitors and sued for the balance.

Judgement
Lord Denning MR held that the doctrine of part payment of a debt not discharging the whole ‘has come under heavy fire’ but noted that estoppel, deriving from the principle laid down in Hughes v Metropolitan Railway Co., could give relief in equity. Although in his opinion part payment of debt could satisfy a whole debt, he found that Mrs Rees had effectively held the builders to ransom. Therefore, any variation of the original agreement was voidable at the instance of the debtors for duress.

See also
Collier v P & MJ Wright (Holdings) Ltd [2007] EWCA

Notes

References
'A strange sort of survival for Pinnel's case: Collier v P & MJ Wright (Holdings) Ltd' (2008) 71(4) Modern Law Review 611–620

Lord Denning cases
English enforceability case law
English estoppel case law
English duress case law
English unconscionability case law
1965 in British law
Court of Appeal (England and Wales) cases
1965 in case law